is a Japanese actor.

Films
 1972 - Godzilla vs. Gigan (King Ghidorah)
 1977 - House

TV
 1976 - Battle Hawk
 1978 - Monkey

References

External links

Japanese male film actors
Possibly living people
Year of birth missing (living people)